The ARY Film Award for International Icon of the Year is one of the ARY Film Awards of Honorary presented annually by the ARY Digital Network and Entertainment Channel to  actors (Male or Female) working outside Pakistan.

Prestige
International Icon Award is considered to be one of the most honorable award. International Icons are Pakistani actors working in film industry other than Lollywood. They work outside Pakistan and give a massage to the whole word that Pakistanis can be a symbol of excellence anywhere in this world. Representing one's country in the outer word is also a way of expressing one's love for the country. In this way International Icon Award is a symbol of Patriotism. International icons work outside Pakistan to show their talent to them and make the world feel their need. As they have a lot of fans and respect outside Pakistan, they became inspiration for juniors in their field.

Selection System
International Icons have been awarded since 2014 when ARY Film Awards started. Being a prestigious award, International Icon Award has no nominee system. It is jury choice award.

Winners

International Icon Award was first awarded to Ali Zafar for his excellent achievement in Bollywood. At 2nd ARY Film Awards, Fawad Khan won this award for his excellence and achievement in India.

References

External links 

 ARY Film Awards Official website

ARY Film Award winners
ARY Film Awards